The 1957 Texas Longhorns football team represented the University of Texas at Austin during the 1957 NCAA University Division football season. This was the first year as head coach for future College Football Hall of Fame coach, Darrell Royal. On Thanksgiving Day, Texas upset #4 Texas A&M, led Heisman Trophy winner John David Crow, at Kyle Field, 9–7.

Schedule

References

Texas
Texas Longhorns football seasons
Texas Longhorns football